The Angers tramway is a single-line tramway in the French city of Angers in Pays de la Loire. 

Opened on 25 June 2011, Line A is operated by Keolis and replaced some bus lines, with the buses redeployed throughout the rest of the metropolitan area. The Alstom APS ground-level power supply has been used on two parts of the line totalling  in order to avoid overhead lines in the centre of Angers and Avrillé. Angers is the second city using such system, after Bordeaux.

Timeline 
 April 2007: Works officially started.
 April 2010: Delivery of the Alstom Citadis 302 trams
 December 2010: Testing
 January 2011: Operation of shadow service without passengers
 25 June 2011: Line A in service

Current Service - Line A 
The total budget for the first line, re-evaluated in 2008, is around €350m (€47m for the trams), up from the 2004 estimate of €250m. 

Main features for Line A: 
 North-South connection across the metropolitan area, connecting Avrillé (third most populous town ) to La Roseraie (most populous district in Angers).
 Non-stop service from 5.30 AM until 0.30 AM (19 hours a day)
 
 25 stations
 End to end journey time of 37 minutes;
 Average speed of 20 km/h (13 mph)
 6 minute headways during peak hours.
 an estimated 35,000 passengers expected daily.

As the line goes on both banks of the Maine, a new bridge was built to allow the trams to cross the river.  It connects Angers' University Hospital Centre to Saint-Serge. This 270m bridge is accessible to bicycles and pedestrians as well as emergency vehicles.

Stations

Angers-Roseraie
Jean Vilar
Jean XXIII
Bamako
Strasbourg
Place Lafayette
Les Gares
Foch-Haras
Foch-Maison Bleue
Ralliement
Molière
Saint-Serge Université
Berges de Maine
C.H.U-Hôpital
Capucins
Jean Moulin
Les Hauts De Saint Aubin
Verneau
Terra Botanica
Plateau Mayenne
Bois du Roy
Acacias
Saint Gilles
Bascule
Avrillé-Ardenne

Advantages
 Good public transport system for Avrillé (third town in the metropolitan area after Angers and Trélazé), bringing more life to the city centre and assisting with the development of new neighbourhoods
 Connecting new districts: Plateaux de la Mayenne and des Capucins
 Tram station close to Terra Botanica
 Connecting important  facilities such as the University Hospital Centre (4,500 employees and 3,000 visitors a day), Angers Saint-Laud railway station and the administrative city
 The new bridge on the Maine is used by trams, bicycles and pedestrians between the hospital and the Gaumont Film Company studios.
 A better connections to the Angers city centre and improved traffic flows
 A more attractive city centre (including a larger pedestrian area) 
 Complementarity of different transport types around the central connection point, Angers Saint-Laud railway station and bus station
 Connecting La Roseraie as part of the urban renovation of the district.

Drawbacks
No connection to the biggest campus of Angers in Belle-Beille, which is to be connected by Line B.
Line A passes through place du Ralliement, which will still be accessible for pedestrians, emergency and delivery vehicles as well as bicycles, but buses will not have access to it, nor will other tram lines.

Rolling stock 
Angers Loire Métropole awarded Alstom a €47m contract to supply 17 Citadis 302 trams on 15 November 2006.

Design of rolling stock

Design and personalization of the rolling stock is characterized by the front end "convergence" V-shape similar in form to a shield. The other major feature is the ubiquity of a rainbow, designed by the French agency RCP Design Global is found in the color scheme and interior design of the trams and other transportation in the city. 

The interior of the trams is marked by floral figures in different colors on the ceiling, white walls and green seats to reflect the geological layers of Anjou.

Future services  

The  Line B was expected to be opened by 2020. It was planned to run from Beaucouzé, via the Atoll shopping centre via the Campus Belle-Beille - Université Angers to the main railway station and Parc des Expositions (Saint-Sylvain-d'Anjou) through Monplaisir district. Due to financial reasons, the start of construction has been postponed for 2019, so that a start of passenger transport can not be expected until 2022.  

It has been announced that the Line A will be rerouted from September 2020 via Centre de Congrès, avoiding Place du Railiement, using new tracks, a new junction south of Saint-Serge - Université and an existing junction immediately north of Foch-Maison Bleue that was built with the original line to facilitate a future expansion. The new route will serve two new stops at Centre de Congrès and Hôtel de Ville. The existing route between Molière and Foch-Maison Bleue will be retained as part of Line C that will run between Line B's western terminus at Belle-Beille - Campus and Line A's southern terminus at Angers - Roseraie allowing a direct connection between Belle Beille and Angers-Saint-Laud station.

Network Map

See also 
 Trams in France
 List of town tramway systems in France

References

External links

Angers Loire métropole tram website 

Angers
Keolis
Tram transport in France
Transport in Pays de la Loire
Angers